Robbie Diack (born 12 November 1985 in Johannesburg, South Africa) is a South African born, Irish former rugby union player who last played for Ulster in the Pro14. He played in the back row mainly as a number eight.

Career
He signed for Ulster at the start of the 2008/2009 season from the South African club The Stormers. He became eligible to play rugby for Ireland in July 2011 after living in Ireland for the required three years. In October 2010 Diack signed a contract keeping him with Ulster until June 2014. In 2017, he became the first person born outside of Ulster to make 200 appearances.

In March 2013, Diack was called up to the Ireland squad for the first time, having been selected for the 35 man training squad for the Six Nations clash with France. He made his full Ireland debut in the victory over Argentina in 2014 at the June Internationals.

Diack played his final game for Ulster in May 2018 against the Ospreys during the European Champions Cup playoff.

Sources 

Ulster Rugby players
Western Province (rugby union) players
Stormers players
1985 births
Living people
Ireland international rugby union players
Ireland Wolfhounds international rugby union players
Rugby union flankers
Rugby union number eights
Alumni of Michaelhouse